James Wood (1672–1759) was a Presbyterian minister of the first Atherton and Chowbent Chapels in Atherton, Greater Manchester, England. During the Jacobite rising, he was given the title "the General" for leading a force of men that routed the Highlanders.

Biography
James Wood was born in Atherton, the son of James Wood (1639–1694) the nonconformist minister of Atherton Chapel and his wife Anne Townley. His father was imprisoned in 1670 for defying the law and preaching in the homes of sympathisers after Atherton Chapel had been closed by the Act of Uniformity 1662. In addition, the act affected his grandfather, also James Wood (d. 1667), a powerful orator and reformer who was ejected from the perpetual curacy of Ashton in Makerfield, forbidden from preaching in his church and deprived of his living.

James was educated by the Reverend Richard Frankland at Rathmell Academy. He assisted his father and succeeded him at Atherton Chapel in 1695. James was described by a member of his congregation,

"In person he was above the middle size and rather bulky: his appearance in the pulpit was very venerable and striking. He always wore a gown and bands, with a pretty large white wig when performing public worship. His sermons were delivered in a most solemn manner (yet without cant), and made considerable impression on his hearers."

Minister Wood married in 1717 when he was 45. His wife Hannah died nine years later. 
The Atherton Estate Survey of 1734 reveals Wood was also a farmer, occupying a house with an orchard and fields covering 12 Cheshire acres and a smithy which was rented to a nailor. In 1742 though many dissenters objected to paying the church rate, Wood paid his share.

"General" James Wood died in 1759. The location of his grave is unknown, but is speculated to be at Chowbent where his wife and mother are buried.

Battle

In 1715, at the time of the Jacobite rising, supporters of the Old Pretender were marching on Preston. James Wood received a letter from Sir Henry Hoghton, countersigned by General Charles Wills, requesting him to "raise all the force you can, and bring arms fit for service—scythes in straight poles—spades and bill hooks and draw them to Cuerden Green about two miles from Preston." Minister Wood assembled a force of Chowbent men and led them to Cuerden Green where, in the Battle of Preston, they were given the job of guarding the bridge over the River Ribble at Walton-le-Dale and the ford at Penwortham, both of which were successfully defended. Estimates for the size of Wood's contingent vary from 80, which is most likely, to 400 men.

After the Highlanders were routed and for his efforts Wood was given a £100 pension by parliament and the title "the General" by his Chowbent congregation.

Chowbent Chapel
Wood's congregation grew to about 1,000 members, the third largest in Lancashire. It occupied Atherton Chapel, the old Bent Chapel, a small brick building with three windows and a porch. Its windows had curved arches with diamond panes of glass in leaded frames. Inside was a three-tier pulpit. The chapel was built in 1645 on land owned by lord of the manor, John Atherton. In 1721 his successor Richard Atherton, a supporter of the Jacobite cause, expelled James Wood and the congregation from the chapel for their part in the battle. The dissenters left quietly and met in local barns and houses, including the minister's home at Gib Fold, until they had built Chowbent Chapel, completed in 1722 on land donated by Nathan Mort at Alderfold. Wood was instrumental in raising money for the chapel and used his pension towards the cost.

References

Bibliography

1672 births
1759 deaths
People of the Jacobite rising of 1715
Wood, James
People from Atherton, Greater Manchester
18th-century Presbyterian ministers